The MV Island Home is a ferry built by VT Halter Marine in 2005 for the Steamship Authority. She has been serving the Woods Hole–Martha's Vineyard route since her maiden voyage on March 5, 2007.

The Island Home is different from most vessels in the Steamship Authority fleet in that she is a double-ended ferry and does not have to turn around before entering a slip.

Island Home was named after the sidewheel steamer Island Home which served Martha's Vineyard for most of the second half of the nineteenth century.

Her keel was laid on April 27, 2005 and she was launched on July 21, 2006. Her final construction cost was $32.1 million.

Island Home was built to a plan by the Elliott Bay Design Group, and has a capacity of 1,200 people and 76 vehicles, with a loaded displacement tonnage of about 1,950 tonnes and a gross tonnage of 4,311.

In October 2007, Island Home experienced a minor collision when the Governor struck her while departing Woods Hole; damage to both vessels was minimal.

References

External links 

 Steamship Authority
 Video Clips of Island Home

Ferries of Massachusetts
Martha's Vineyard
2006 ships
Ships built in Pascagoula, Mississippi